Marlon Sandino de Ramos Rodrigues, known professionally as Marlon Ramos is a Brazilian internet personality, music video producer and record producer.

Biography 
Marlon Ramos was born in Apiai and raised in Guapiara. Later moved to Curitiba, where he studied cinematography, post-production and photography.

Career 
He is best known for directing music videos, short films, music records, YouTube series and is currently associated with Marlon Ramos Film.

See also 
 Lists of people from Brazil

References 
 Marlon Ramos Film Lyrics, Songs, and Albums | Genius. Retrieved October 2, 2017
 Bem Paraná. Retrieved June 2, 2017
 Marlon Ramos on Spotify 
 Conheça quatro lanches tamanho família para pedir durante a quarentena em Curitiba - VR News. Retrieved November 1, 2019
 Cinco vídeos diferentões de Curitiba que viralizaram e você não sabia - Jornale. Retrieved May 29, 2020
 Grande Curitiba: jovens filmam luzes voadoras que afirmam ser Ovnis - RIC Mais. Retrieved January 22, 2020
 Case de Sucesso: conheça Marlon Ramos, o criador do fenômeno Curitiba Mil Graus! - Ler News. Retrieved April18, 2020
 Conheça Marlon Ramos, o YouTuber de Curitiba que faz sucesso com vídeos de cachorros-quentes gigantes - POP FM. Retrieved December 18, 2019
 5 vídeos diferentões de Curitiba que viralizaram e você não sabia - Toca Cultural. Retrieved May 27, 2020
 APERTE O PLAY: 4 vídeos diferentões de Curitiba que viralizaram e você não sabia - TOPVIEW. Retrieved May 29, 2020
 Conheça os lanches gigantes que pesam até 5 kg -  Rede Massa. Retrieved July 10, 2020
 APERTE O PLAY: 4 vídeos diferentões de Curitiba que viralizaram e você não sabia - RIC Mais. Retrieved May 31, 2020
 Ano Novo fora de época já tem data marcada em Curitiba  - CBN Curitiba. Retrieved March 03, 2017
 Evento no Facebook convida para assistir aos fogos de ano novo no Parque Barigui - Gazeta do Povo. Retrieved December 26, 2017
 Marlon Ramos, do Curitiba Mil Graus é exemplo de sucesso na web  - Tabloide Brasil - Retrieved October 9, 2020

 Marlon Ramos, do Curitiba Mil Graus é exemplo de sucesso na web  - Jornal Notícia do Brasil. Retrieved October 9, 2020

External links 
 Marlon Ramos on Instagram

Marlon Ramos YouTube channel

Brazilian film directors
Music video producers
Brazilian music video directors
People from Curitiba